Sarısu is a village and municipality in the Goygol District of Azerbaijan.

References 

Populated places in Goygol District